Bragg-Gray cavity theory relates the radiation dose in a cavity volume of material  to the dose that would exist in a surrounding medium  in the absence of the cavity volume.  It was developed in 1936 by British scientists Louis Harold Gray, William Henry Bragg, and William Lawrence Bragg.

Most often, material  is assumed to be a gas, however Bragg-Gray cavity theory applies to any cavity volume (gas, liquid, or solid) that meets the following Bragg-Gray conditions.

 The dimensions of the cavity containing  is small with respect to the range of charged particles striking the cavity so that the cavity does not perturb the charged particle field.
 The absorbed dose in the cavity containing  is deposited entirely by charged particles crossing it.

When the Bragg-Gray conditions are met,  then
,
where
 is the dose to material  (SI unit Gray)
 is the dose to the cavity material   (SI unit Gray)

In an ionization chamber, the dose to material  (typically a gas) is

where
is the mass of the gas (SI unit kg)
 is the mean energy required to produce an ion pair in  divided by the charge of an electron (SI units Joules/Coulomb)

See also
 Ionizing radiation
 Ionization chamber

Sources
 Khan, F. M. (2003). The physics of radiation therapy (3rd ed.). Lippincott Williams & Wilkins: Philadelphia. .

 Attix, F.H. (1986). Introduction to Radiological Physics and Radiation Dosimetry, Wiley-Interscience: New York. .

Physics theorems